Hyōsube is a Japanese yōkai. There are legends
about them in many areas such as Saga Prefecture and 
Miyazaki Prefecture.

It is a child-sized river monster from Kyūshū that lives in underwater caves. It prefers to come out at night and loves to eat eggplants. It is a cousin of the supernatural yōkai in kappa folklore.

Origin
They are said to be the companions of kappa, and they
have alternate names of kappa and gawappa in the Saga Prefecture and
gaataro in the Nagasaki Prefecture, but it is also said that legends about
them are even older than ones about kappa.

They are said to have originated from Binzhushen (兵主神), the later name for
Chiyou, and there are considered to be legends of them together with the
Hata clan among other returnees. Originally revered as battle gods, in
Japan they eventually came to acquire faith as food gods, and they are
currently enshrined in places like Yasu, Shiga Prefecture
and Tanba, Hyōgo Prefecture where there are shrines
called Hyōzu Jinja (兵主神社).

There are several hypotheses on the origin of their name, and besides the later
mentioned Hyōbu-taifu (兵部大輔), it is also said they got their name from the
"hyou hyou" (flapping) sounds they cry out when going back and forth along
mountain streams during Higan.

Legends by area
In Katei 3 (1237),  the military commander Tachibana no Kiminari moved
from Iyo Province (now Ehime Prefecture) to Take,
Saga Prefecture and constructed a shrine on the summit of the mountain
behind Shiomi Jinja, but his follow Hyōsube (兵主部) was also said to have
moved to the Shiomi river, and nowadays the god enshrined at Shiomi Jinja is
considered to be Shibuy's follower, Hyōsube. Also, in the past during Kasuga
Jinja's construction, the artisans at that time used a secret method to give
life to a doll which provided labor in the shrine's construction, but after
the shrine's completion, the unneeded doll was thrown away into a river and
turned into a kappa to cause harm to people, and the First assistant to the Minister (Hyōbu-taifu), Shimada
Maru quelled it, which is why it is said that the kappa has come to be called
Hyōsube.

The chief priest of Shiomi Jinja, the Mōri family, and to ward off water
disasters and kappa, there is the phrase "Hyōsube, forget not the promise, the
one who stands at this river is a child of the old Sugawara"
(兵主部よ約束せしは忘るなよ川立つをのこ跡はすがわら). It is said that this
comes from how in Kyushu, Sugawara no Michizane, who was demoted to the
position of Dazaifu (Kyushu regional government) saved
a kappa, who then made a promise not to harm Michizane's family, so the phrase
means "Hyōsube and all, do not forget the promise. This man great at swimming
is a descendant of Sugawara no Michizane."

There are also the alternate names of Hyōsue, Hyōsubo, Hyōsunbo, Hyōsunbe,
etc.

Characteristics
Although kappa are often said to like cucumbers, Hyōsube are said to like
eggplants, and there is a tradition of putting a spear through a fresh
eggplant and setting it upright on a field to offer to the Hyōsube.

It is also sometimes thought that they would spread diseases to people, and it is said that those who see Hyōsube would be afflicted with a fever of
unknown cause, and this fever causing disease would even spread to the other
people around. There is also a story about a woman who saw Hyōsube ravaging
an eggplant field who subsequently had an illness that cause her entire body
to become purple, which eventually led to her death.
 
Also, Hyōsube are considered to have an extremely hairy appearance, and it is
said that they would sneak into private residences and enter their baths, and
soaking in the bath, the bathtub would have a ton of hair floating on top, and
horses that touch the bath would die. There is also a similar tale where Hyō
would come soak in the bath almost every night at a medicinal bathing
establishment, and after Hyōsube soaks in the bath, the bath would have its
entire surface covered with hair making it stinky, which is why the bath was
later purposefully drained, but as a result, the horse that was being raised
at the bathing establishment was killed.

In literature, if Hyōsube laughs, then laughing too from this results in
death. This is said to originally be from Satō Arifumi's writing, Ichiban
Kuwashii Nihon Yōkai Zukan (いちばんくわしい日本妖怪図鑑). According to this
book, upon encountering with someone, Hyōsube would laugh "hee hee hee," and
if that other person also laughs from this, they would get a fever and die,
but it's been suggested that this is an idea that Hyōsube simply made up.

In yōkai depictions from the Edo Period such as by Toriyama Sekien
among others, they have a very hairy appearance as in the legends, a bald head,
and making a humorous pose as if they had already eaten someone. This
appearance has been said to have been modeled after the Southeast Asian
Gibbon.

Origin

Hyōsube were dolls that were brought to life by a magician and used to build a shrine. After the shrine was finished they were dumped in a river. They were believed to be named after Hyōbu-taifu. They are found generally in Saga and Miyazaki prefectures in Kyushu.

Description
Hyōsube are small creatures with hairy bodies and bald heads, sharp teeth, and long claws. They live in rivers but like to come out at night and get into people's bathtubs. Once they are done using the bathtubs, they leave them smelly and covered in greasy hair.

References

Yōkai
Kappa (folklore)